Epstein-Barr virus induced gene 3, also known as interleukin-27 subunit beta or IL-27B, is a protein which in humans is encoded by the EBI3 gene.

Function 

This gene was identified by the induction of its expression in B lymphocytes by Epstein–Barr virus infection. The protein encoded by this gene is a secreted glycoprotein, which is a member of the hematopoietin receptor family related to the p40 subunit of interleukin 12 (IL-12). It plays a role in regulating cell-mediated immune responses.

EBI3 is a subunit in 2 distinct heterodimeric cytokines: interleukin-27 (IL27) and IL35. IL27 is composed of p28 (IL27) and EBI3. IL27 can trigger signaling in T cells, B cells, and myeloid cells. IL35, an inhibitory cytokine involved in regulatory T-cell function, is composed of EBI3 and the  p35 subunit of IL12.

References

Further reading

External links